This is a list of Masters of St Catharine's College, Cambridge listed by year of appointment.

References

 

 Masters of St Catharine's College
Saint Catherines